Ice Water is the seventh album by guitarist Leo Kottke.  It contains Kottke's only charting single, the Tom T. Hall composition "Pamela Brown". Ice Water peaked at #69 on the Billboard Pop Albums charts.

It was re-issued on CD by BGO (CD146) in 1992 and One Way Records in 1996.

Kottke has stated that he recorded the vocals for the entire album while lying on his back after being told by an Air Force sergeant that this position helps open the diaphragm and could improve one's singing voice (Kottke amusingly admits that "it didn't work").

Reception

Writing for Allmusic, music critic Bruce Eder noted that the album was more directed to country flavored vocals and wrote of the album "This is a good record, though not the Leo Kottke album to start with, as it is not representative of his usual work... Among the instrumentals, "A Good Egg" is just the kind of light-fingered, light-textured virtuoso piece that one buys a Leo Kottke album expecting to find, and much of the rest shows off his talents in some unexpected directions."

Track listing
All songs by Leo Kottke except as noted.

Side one
 "Morning is the Long Way Home" – 6:26
 "Pamela Brown" (Tom T. Hall) – 4:03
 "A Good Egg" – 3:10
 "Tilt Billings and the Student Prince" (Leo Kottke, Ron Nagle) – 4:56
 "All Through the Night" (Traditional; arranged by Kottke) – 1:30

Side two
 "Short Stories" (Leo Kottke, Cal Hand) – 3:01
 "You Tell Me Why" (Ron Elliott) – 3:58
 "You Know I Know You Know" – 4:08
 "Born to Be With You" (Don Robertson) – 3:02
 "A Child Should Be a Fish" – 3:45

Charts

Personnel
Leo Kottke — 6- & 12-string guitar, vocals
Bill Berg — drums, percussion
Bill Peterson — bass
Bill Barber - piano
Cal Hand — dobro, steel guitar

Production notes
Album Design & Illustration Concept—John Van Hamersveld
Produced By Denny Bruce (Takoma Productions, Inc.)
Recorded, Mixed & Mastered—Sound 80, Minneapolis, Minnesota
Engineer—Paul “Don't Call Me Slater Martin” Martinson

References

External links
Leo Kottke's official site
Unofficial Leo Kottke web site (fan site)
The Capitol Years

1974 albums
Leo Kottke albums
Capitol Records albums
Albums produced by Denny Bruce